Kamran Ghasempour (born 16 Dec 1996) is an Iranian freestyle wrestler who competes at 92 kilograms, where he is the reigning World Champion. He is also a two-time Asian Continental champion and a two-time World U23 Champion at 86 kilograms.

Career 

He won the gold medal in the men's 86kg event at the 2018 World U23 Wrestling Championship in Bucharest, Romania and at the 2019 World U23 Wrestling Championship in Budapest, Hungary.

In 2019, he won the gold medal in the 86kg event at the Asian Wrestling Championships held in Xi'an, China. He also secured the gold medal in the 92kg event at the 2021 Asian Wrestling Championships held in Almaty, Kazakhstan.

He won the gold medal in the men's 92kg event at the 2021 World Wrestling Championships held in Oslo, Norway. He also won the gold medal in the men's 92kg event at the 2022 World Wrestling Championships held in Belgrade, Serbia.

Achievements

Freestyle record 

! colspan="7"| Senior Freestyle Matches
|-
!  Res.
!  Record
!  Opponent
!  Score
!  Date
!  Event
!  Location
|-
! style=background:white colspan=7 |
|-
|Win
|75–4
|align=left| Mehdi hajiluiian
|style="font-size:88%"|11–0
|style="font-size:88%" rowspan=2|18 November 2022
|style="font-size:88%" rowspan=3|2022 Imam Memorial Premier Cup
|style="text-align:left;font-size:88%;" rowspan=2| tehran
|-
|Win
|74–4
|align=left| Mohammad Javad Ebrahimi
|style="font-size:88%"|2–1
|-
|Win
|73–4
|align=left| Ahmad Bazri
|style="font-size:88%"|8–0
|style="font-size:88%"|10 November 2022
|style="text-align:left;font-size:88%;" | Qaem Shahr
|-
! style=background:white colspan=7 |
|-
|Win
|72–4
|align=left| J'den Cox
|style="font-size:88%"|2–0
|style="font-size:88%"|17 September 2022
|style="font-size:88%" rowspan=4|2022 World Championships
|style="text-align:left;font-size:88%;" rowspan=4| Belgrade, Serbia
|-
|Win
|71–4
|align=left| Miriani Maisuradze
|style="font-size:88%"|5–0
|style="font-size:88%" rowspan=3|16 September 2022
|-
|Win
|70–4
|align=left| Akhmed Bataev
|style="font-size:88%"|8–1
|-
|Win
|69–4
|align=left| Adlan Viskhanov
|style="font-size:88%"|TF 10–0
|-
! style=background:white colspan=7 |
|-
|Win
|68–4
|align=left| Amir Hossein Firouzpour
|style="font-size:88%"|4–0
|style="font-size:88%" rowspan=1|10 July 2022
|style="font-size:88%" rowspan=1|2022 Iranian World Team Trials
|style="text-align:left;font-size:88%;" rowspan=1| Tehran, Iran
|-
! style=background:white colspan=7 |
|-
|Win
|67–4
|align=left| Adilet Davlumbayev
|style="font-size:88%"|TF 11–0
|style="font-size:88%" rowspan=4|6 June 2022
|style="font-size:88%" rowspan=4|Bolat Turlykhanov Cup
|style="text-align:left;font-size:88%;" rowspan=4| Almaty, Kazakhstan
|-
|Win
|66–4
|align=left| Abdimanap BAIGENZHEYEV
|style="font-size:88%"|TF 11–0
|-
|Win
|65–4
|align=left| Islyambek ILYASSOV
|style="font-size:88%"|10-0,Fall
|-
|Win
|64–4
|align=left| Viky VIKY  
|style="font-size:88%"|TF 10–0
|-
! style=background:white colspan=7 |
|-
|Win
|63–4
|align=left| Reza Mozafari
|style="font-size:88%"|7–2
|style="font-size:88%"|12 November 2021
|style="font-size:88%" rowspan=2|2021 Imam Memorial Premier Cup
|style="text-align:left;font-size:88%;" rowspan=1| Sari, Iran
|-
|Win
|62–4
|align=left| Arash Nirabadi
|style="font-size:88%"|7–0
|style="font-size:88%"|29 October 2021
|style="text-align:left;font-size:88%;" rowspan=1| Juybar, Iran
|-
! style=background:white colspan=7 |
|-
|Win
|61–4
|align=left| Magomed Kurbanov
|style="font-size:88%"|8–4
|style="font-size:88%"|4 October 2021
|style="font-size:88%" rowspan=4|2021 World Championships
|style="text-align:left;font-size:88%;" rowspan=4| Oslo, Norway
|-
|Win
|60–4
|align=left| J'den Cox
|style="font-size:88%"|3–3
|style="font-size:88%" rowspan=3|3 October 2021
|-
|Win
|59–4
|align=left| Irakli Mtsituri
|style="font-size:88%"|8–1
|-
|Win
|58–4
|align=left| Andriy Vlasov
|style="font-size:88%"|7–0
|-
! style=background:white colspan=7 |
|-
|Win
|57–4
|align=left| Mohammad Javad Ebrahimi
|style="font-size:88%"|4–0
|style="font-size:88%" rowspan=3|26 September 2021
|style="font-size:88%" rowspan=3|2021 Iranian World Team Trials
|style="text-align:left;font-size:88%;" rowspan=3| Tehran, Iran
|-
|Win
|56–4
|align=left| Mohammad Javad Ebrahimi
|style="font-size:88%"|3–2
|-
|Loss
|55–4
|align=left| Mohammad Javad Ebrahimi
|style="font-size:88%"|1–2
|-
! style=background:white colspan=7 |
|-
|Win
|55–3
|align=left| Tsogtgerel Munkhbaatar
|style="font-size:88%"|TF 10–0
|style="font-size:88%" rowspan=3|18 April 2021
|style="font-size:88%" rowspan=3|2021 Asian Continental Championships
|style="text-align:left;font-size:88%;" rowspan=3| Almaty, Kazakhstan
|-
|Win
|54–3
|align=left| Rustam Shodiev
|style="font-size:88%"|TF 11–0
|-
|Win
|53–3
|align=left| Sanjeet
|style="font-size:88%"|TF 10–0
|-
! style=background:white colspan=7 |
|-
|Loss
|52–3
|align=left| Hassan Yazdani
|style="font-size:88%"|2–5
|style="font-size:88%"|9 March 2021
|style="font-size:88%"|2021 Iranian Olympic Team Trials
|style="text-align:left;font-size:88%;"| Tehran, Iran
|-
! style=background:white colspan=7 |
|-
|Win
|
|align=left| Ali Mojerlou
|style="font-size:88%"|inj 0-0
|style="font-size:88%" rowspan=2|10–11 December 2020
|style="font-size:88%" rowspan=2|2020 Imam Memorial Premier Cup
|-
|Win
|52–2
|align=left| Mohammad Ali Tabar
|style="font-size:88%"|4–2
|-
! style=background:white colspan=7 |
|-
|Win
|51–2
|align=left| Arashk Mohebi
|style="font-size:88%"|6–2
|style="font-size:88%" rowspan=3|4 November 2020
|style="font-size:88%" rowspan=3|2020 Iranian Individual World Cup Trials
|style="text-align:left;font-size:88%;" rowspan=3| Tehran, Iran
|-
|Win
|50–2
|align=left| Hossein Jalalinejad
|style="font-size:88%"|6–0
|-
|Win
|49–2
|align=left| Hossein Shahbazi
|style="font-size:88%"|4–0
|-
! style=background:white colspan=7 |
|-
|Win
|48–2
|align=left| Hossein Nouri Safar
|style="font-size:88%"|TF 10–0
|style="font-size:88%" rowspan=3|6–7 October 2020
|style="font-size:88%" rowspan=3|2020 Imam Memorial Premier Cup
|style="text-align:left;font-size:88%;" rowspan=3| Tehran, Iran
|-
|Win
|47–2
|align=left| Arash Nirabadi
|style="font-size:88%"|5–1
|-
|Win
|46–2
|align=left| Masoud Saedi Safar
|style="font-size:88%"|TF 10–0
|-
! style=background:white colspan=7 |
|-
|Win
|45–2
|align=left| Jalal Zaman
|style="font-size:88%"|2–0
|style="font-size:88%" rowspan=2|December 2019
|style="font-size:88%" rowspan=2|2019 Iranian Premier League
|style="text-align:left;font-size:88%;" rowspan=2| Tehran, Iran
|-
|Win
|44–2
|align=left| Ali Mojerlou
|style="font-size:88%"|3–0
|-
! style=background:white colspan=7 |
|-
|Win
|43–2
|align=left| Mersad Morghzari
|style="font-size:88%"|TF 11–0
|style="font-size:88%" rowspan=4|19–20 December 2019
|style="font-size:88%" rowspan=4|2019 World Clubs Cup
|style="text-align:left;font-size:88%;" rowspan=4| Bojnord, Iran
|-
|Win
|
|align=left| Deepak Punia
|style="font-size:88%"|inj 0-0
|-
|Win
|42–2
|align=left| Alatangalida
|style="font-size:88%"|TF 10–0
|-
|Win
|41–2
|align=left| Maisuradze Tarzan
|style="font-size:88%"|9–0
|-
! style=background:white colspan=7 |
|-
|Win
|40–2
|align=left| Gadzhimurad Magomedsaidov
|style="font-size:88%"|9–3
|style="font-size:88%"|30 October 2019
|style="font-size:88%" rowspan=5|2019 World U23 Championships
|style="text-align:left;font-size:88%;" rowspan=5| Bucharest, Romania
|-
|Win
|39–2
|align=left| Osman Göçen
|style="font-size:88%"|4–4
|style="font-size:88%" rowspan=4|29 October 2019
|-
|Win
|38–2
|align=left| Ganbaatar Gankhuyag
|style="font-size:88%"|3–0
|-
|Win
|37–2
|align=left| Krzysztof Sadowik
|style="font-size:88%"|6–0
|-
|Win
|36–2
|align=left| Hovhannes Mkhitaryan
|style="font-size:88%"|5–0
|-
! style=background:white colspan=7 |
|-
|Win
|35–2
|align=left| Gadzhimurad Magomedsaidov
|style="font-size:88%"|TF 10–0
|style="font-size:88%"|10 August 2019
|style="font-size:88%" rowspan=4|2019 Tbilisi Grand Prix of Balavadze and Kartozia
|style="text-align:left;font-size:88%;" rowspan=4| Tbilisi, Georgia
|-
|Win
|34–2
|align=left| Tarzan Maisuradze
|style="font-size:88%"|8–1
|style="font-size:88%" rowspan=3|9 August 2019
|-
|Win
|33–2
|align=left| Sandro Aminashvili
|style="font-size:88%"|TF 11–1
|-
|Win
|32–2
|align=left| Ozkhan Abasov
|style="font-size:88%"|TF 10–0
|-
! style=background:white colspan=7 |
|-
|Loss
|31–2
|align=left| Hassan Yazdani
|style="font-size:88%"|3–6
|style="font-size:88%"|1 July 2019
|style="font-size:88%"|2019 Iranian World Team Trials
|style="text-align:left;font-size:88%;"| Tehran, Iran
|-
! style=background:white colspan=7 |
|-
|Win
|31–1
|align=left| Aligadzhi Gamidgadzhiev
|style="font-size:88%"|TF 10–0
|style="font-size:88%" rowspan=3|24 April 2019
|style="font-size:88%" rowspan=3|2019 Asian Continental Championships
|style="text-align:left;font-size:88%;" rowspan=3| Xi'an, China
|-
|Win
|30–1
|align=left| Deepak Punia
|style="font-size:88%"|TF 10–0
|-
|Win
|29–1
|align=left| Bakhodur Kodirov
|style="font-size:88%"|TF 10–0
|-
! style=background:white colspan=7 |
|-
|Win
|28–1
|align=left| Ahmad Bazri
|style="font-size:88%"|6–0
|style="font-size:88%" rowspan=4|7–8 February 2019
|style="font-size:88%" rowspan=4|2019 Takhi Cup
|style="text-align:left;font-size:88%;" rowspan=4| Kermanshah, Iran
|-
|Win
|27–1
|align=left| Masoud Madadi
|style="font-size:88%"|INJ (3–0)
|-
|Win
|26–1
|align=left| Mersad Marghzari
|style="font-size:88%"|TF 10–0
|-
|Win
|25–1
|align=left| Magomedgadzhi Khatiyev
|style="font-size:88%"|6–0
|-
! style=background:white colspan=7 |
|-
|Win
|24–1
|align=left| Andrii Gyka
|style="font-size:88%"|TF 10–0
|style="font-size:88%"|7 December 2018
|style="font-size:88%"|2018 World Clubs Cup
|style="text-align:left;font-size:88%;"| Babol, Iran
|-
! style=background:white colspan=7 |
|-
|Win
|23–1
|align=left| Artur Naifonov
|style="font-size:88%"|4–1
|style="font-size:88%"|18 November 2018
|style="font-size:88%" rowspan=4|2018 World U23 Championships
|style="text-align:left;font-size:88%;" rowspan=4| Bucharest, Romania
|-
|Win
|22–1
|align=left| Ganbaatar Gankhuyag
|style="font-size:88%"|4–0
|style="font-size:88%" rowspan=3|17 November 2018
|-
|Win
|21–1
|align=left| Arif Özen
|style="font-size:88%"|TF 10–0
|-
|Win
|20–1
|align=left| Lars Schaefle
|style="font-size:88%"|TF 10–0
|-
! style=background:white colspan=7 |
|-
|Loss
|19–1
|align=left| Hassan Yazdani
|style="font-size:88%"|2–8
|rowspan=3|10 May 2018
|rowspan=3|2018 Iran World Team Trials
|rowspan=3| Tehran
|-
|Win
|19–0
|align=left| Ahmad Bazri
|style="font-size:88%"|7–4
|-
|Win
|18–0
|align=left| Alireza Karimi
|style="font-size:88%"|5–0
|-
! style=background:white colspan=7 |
|-
|Win
|17–0
|align=left| Richard Perry
|style="font-size:88%"|4–1
|style="font-size:88%" rowspan=5|23–25 February 2018
|style="font-size:88%" rowspan=5|XXII Outstanding Ukrainian Wrestlers and Coaches Memorial
|style="text-align:left;font-size:88%;" rowspan=5| Kiev, Ukraine
|-
|Win
|16–0
|align=left| Shamil Kudiyamagomedov
|style="font-size:88%"|6–2
|-
|Win
|15–0
|align=left| Stefan Reichmuth
|style="font-size:88%"|9–0
|-
|Win
|14–0
|align=left| Aleksandr Gostiyev
|style="font-size:88%"|5–3
|-
|Win
|13–0
|align=left| Kanan Aliyev
|style="font-size:88%"|TF 11–0
|-
! style=background:white colspan=7 |
|-
|Win
|12–0
|align=left| Ahmet Bilici
|style="font-size:88%"|5–4
|style="font-size:88%" rowspan=4|8–9 February 2018
|style="font-size:88%" rowspan=4|2018 Takhi Cup
|style="text-align:left;font-size:88%;" rowspan=4| Tabriz, Iran
|-
|Win
|11–0
|align=left| Osman Göçen
|style="font-size:88%"|10–4
|-
|Win
|10–0
|align=left| Gadzhimurad Magomedsaidov
|style="font-size:88%"|8–5
|-
|Win
|9–0
|align=left| Saken Aitzhanov
|style="font-size:88%"|7–4
|-
! style=background:white colspan=7 |
|-
|Win
|8–0
|align=left| Ezzatollah Akbari
|style="font-size:88%"|8–6
|style="font-size:88%" rowspan=1|2017
|rowspan=1|2017 Iran League
|rowspan=1| Kiasar
|-
! style=background:white colspan=7 |
|-
|Win
|7–0
|align=left| Deepak Punia
|style="font-size:88%"|6–0
|style="font-size:88%" rowspan=3|1 October 2017
|style="font-size:88%" rowspan=3|2017 Dmitri Korkin Grand Prix
|style="text-align:left;font-size:88%;" rowspan=3| Yakutsk, Russia
|-
|Win
|6–0
|align=left| Ismail Mahmoudi
|style="font-size:88%"|2–1
|-
|Win
|5–0
|align=left| Solif Dam
|style="font-size:88%"|TF 10–0
|-
! style=background:white colspan=7 |
|-
|Win
|4–0
|align=left| Ezzatollah Akbari
|style="font-size:88%"|6–0
|rowspan=4|2017
|rowspan=4|2017 Iran Nationals
|rowspan=4| Tehran
|-
|Win
|3–0
|align=left| Massoud Madadi
|style="font-size:88%"|5–4
|-
|Win
|2–0
|align=left| Dezi Rupileh Yarmaz
|style="font-size:88%"|Fall
|-
|Win
|1–0
|align=left| Hashnamark Rima
|style="font-size:88%"|5–4
|-

References

External links 

 

Living people
1996 births
People from Juybar
Iranian male sport wrestlers
Asian Wrestling Championships medalists
World Wrestling Champions
Sportspeople from Mazandaran province
21st-century Iranian people